Elections in Lebanon are allotted to occur every four years. Every citizen is allowed to vote, but the positions are constitutionally allocated by religious affiliation. In 2014, the Parliament failed to elect a president and extended its own term.

Parliamentary electoral system 

Lebanon's national legislature is called the Chamber of Deputies. Since the elections of 1992 (the first since the reforms of the Taif Agreement of 1989) removed the built-in majority previously enjoyed by Christians, the Parliament is composed of 128 seats with a term of four years.

Seats in the Parliament are confessionally distributed but elected by universal suffrage. Each religious community has an allotted number of seats in the Parliament (see the table below). They do not represent only their co-religionists, however; all candidates in a particular constituency, regardless of religious affiliation, must receive a plurality of the total vote, which includes followers of all confessions. The system was designed to minimize inter-sectarian competition and maximize cross-confessional cooperation: candidates are opposed only by co-religionists, but must seek support from outside their own faith in order to be elected.

In practice, this system has led to charges of gerrymandering. The opposition Qornet Shehwan Gathering, a group opposed to the previous pro-Syrian governments, has claimed that constituency boundaries have been drawn so as to allow many Shi'a Muslims to be elected from Shi'a-majority constituencies (where the Hezbollah Party is strong), while allocating many Christian members to Muslim-majority constituencies, forcing Christian politicians to represent Muslim interests. Similar charges, but in reverse, were made against the Chamoun administration in the 1950s.

The following table sets out the confessional allocation of seats in the Parliament before and after the Taif Agreement.

Before the next election, the electoral law will be reformed. Among the changes most likely are a reduction of the voting age from 21 to 18, a more proportional electoral system, reforms to the oversight of elections and an invitation for Lebanese voters from abroad to register in the embassies, although there is no clear promise of them being able to vote from abroad.

Especially outside the major cities, elections tend to focus more on local than national issues, and it is not unusual for a party to join an electoral ticket in one constituency while aligned with a rival party – even an ideologically opposite party – in another constituency.

Lebanese presidential elections are indirect, with the President being elected to a 6-year term by the Parliament.

Elections took place on June 7, 2009. The Rafik Hariri Martyr List, an anti-Syrian bloc led by Saad Hariri, captured control of the legislature winning 71 of the 128 available seats. The Amal-Hezbollah alliance won 30 seats, with 27 seats going to the Free Patriotic Movement and allied parties.

The most recent general elections were held in Lebanon on 15 May 2022. See 2022 Lebanese general election.

See also 
 Cedar Revolution
 Electoral calendar
 Electoral system
 2007 Lebanese by-elections

References

External links
Adam Carr's Election Archive
Libanvote: an exhaustive record of all elections since 1927, with a constituency-by-constituency breakdown of votes by candidate, together with any subsequent byelections for particular constituencies.
Mohammad Bazzi: Lebanese Election Preview Council on Foreign Relations
Naharnet Elections 2009 Coverage: Candidate and District News
Election Laws and Codes 
Seat Allocation by Confession by District (map) 
Sharek961 empowers Lebanese citizens to promote transparency by sending in eyewitness reports on all election-related incidents or issues. People across Lebanon can send in reports through SMS, email, and the web.